is a Japanese professional footballer who plays as a forward for Portuguese club Camacha on loan from Oliveirense.

Career
In January 2020, Obi signed for Portuguese side Oliveirense from Iwaki.

On 31 January 2023, Obi joined Camacha on loan.

Personal life
He is the brother of fellow professional footballer Powell Obinna Obi.

References

External links
 
 

1999 births
Japanese people of Nigerian descent
Living people
Japanese footballers
Association football forwards
Albirex Niigata players
Iwaki FC players
U.D. Oliveirense players
Sport Benfica e Castelo Branco players
A.D. Camacha players
Liga Portugal 2 players
Campeonato de Portugal (league) players
Japanese expatriate footballers
Japanese expatriate sportspeople in Portugal
Expatriate footballers in Portugal